The following lists events that happened during 2016 in Kenya.

Incumbents
Uhuru Kenyatta, President, 2013-current
William Ruto, Deputy President, 2013-current
Willy Mutunga, Chief Justice, 2011-2016
David Maraga, Chief Justice, 2016-current

Events
A court in Mombasa sentences a primary schoolteacher and imam, Salim Mohamed Wabwire, to 20 years in prison for instructing his pupils to kill Christians. Wabwire, who taught at Jihad Mosque in Mombasa, was acquitted on charges of Al Shabaab membership and terrorist recruitment.
63 athletes from Kenya will compete at the 2016 Summer Olympics in Rio de Janeiro, Brazil from 5-21 August

Public holidays

See also

Timeline of Kenyan history

References

 
2010s in Kenya
Years of the 21st century in Kenya